KTXC-LP, UHF analog channel 46 (VHF digital channel 10.2), was a low-powered independent television station serving Amarillo, Texas, United States that was licensed to Canyon.

Co-owned KFDA-TV shared its studios in rural Potter County north of Amarillo, while its transmitter was based in Canyon.

History

The station signed on as UPN affiliate KZBZ-LP on September 16, 2002, taking the UPN affiliation from KCPN-LP (channel 33). KZBZ then became independent once UPN ceased operations on September 15, 2006.

On September 10, 2007, the then-KZBZ-LP launched their own local news called KZBZ Primetime News @ 9 hosted by Steve Myers.

On September 21, 2009, KZBZ-LP changed to simulcast programming on KFDA-TV 10.2 and was renamed News channel 10 Too. Telemundo Amarillo moved to digital channel 10.3 due to this.

The station changed its call sign to KTXC-LP on July 8, 2015. The station's license was cancelled by the Federal Communications Commission on July 23, 2015.

Programming

Syndicated programming on KZBZ included: TMZ, Family Feud, Law & Order: Special Victims Unit, and Maury.

TXC-LP
Television channels and stations established in 2009
Defunct television stations in the United States
Television channels and stations disestablished in 2015
2009 establishments in Texas
2015 disestablishments in Texas
Randall County, Texas
TXC-LP